The Darvazeh No Mosque is a historical mosque from the Qajar era in Isfahan, Iran.

See also 
List of the historical structures in the Isfahan province

Mosques in Isfahan